The commune of Buraza is a commune of Gitega Province in central Burundi. The capital lies at Buraza.

References

Communes of Burundi
Gitega Province